The 34th (South Midland) Anti-Aircraft Brigade (34 AA Bde) was an air defence formation of Anti-Aircraft Command in the British Territorial Army formed shortly before the outbreak of the Second World War. It defended the West Midlands of England during The Blitz.

Origin
34th (South Midland) Anti-Aircraft (AA) Brigade was formed on 1 April 1938 at Coventry, and was assigned to 4th AA Division when that formation was created in Western Command on 1 September that year. They were transferred to the new AA Command in 1939, with 34 AA Bde responsible for the air defence of Coventry and Birmingham. Brigadier Sidney Archibald, MC, was appointed to command the brigade on 27 April 1938. In 1940 he became Brigadier, Royal Artillery, at Eastern Command and then Major-General, Royal Artillery, at GHQ Home Forces.

Order of Battle 1939
On the outbreak of war the brigade controlled the following units of the Royal Artillery:

 69th (Royal Warwickshire Regiment) Anti-Aircraft Regiment, RA – Heavy Anti-Aircraft (HAA) regiment formed in 1936 by conversion of 6th Battalion, Royal Warwickshire Regiment 
 Regimental Headquarters (RHQ), 192 and 199 AA Batteries at Kings Heath, Birmingham
 190 and 191 AA Batteries at Alum Rock, Birmingham
 73rd Anti-Aircraft Regiment, RA – raised in 1937 from batteries drawn from 62nd Field Brigade and 51st (Midland) Medium Brigade, RA
 RHQ and 209 (Wolverhampton) AA Battery at Wolverhampton
 222 (West Bromwich) AA Battery at West Bromwich
 311 AA Battery at Brierley Hill
 95th (Birmingham) Anti-Aircraft Regiment, RA – newly raised in April 1939, with 204 Bty from 73 AA Regiment
 RHQ and 293 AA Battery at Washwood Heath
 204 (Warwickshire) AA Battery at Saltley
 34th AA Brigade Company Royal Army Service Corps

Mobilisation
The TA's AA units were mobilised on 23 September 1938 during the Munich Crisis, manning their emergency positions within 24 hours, even though many did not yet have their full complement of men or equipment. The emergency lasted three weeks, and they were stood down on 13 October. In February 1939 the existing AA defences came under the control of a new Anti-Aircraft Command. In June, as the international situation worsened, a partial mobilisation of the TA was begun in a process known as 'couverture', whereby each AA unit did a month's tour of duty in rotation to man selected AA gun positions. On 24 August, ahead of the declaration of war, AA Command was fully mobilised at its war stations. The HAA guns of 34 AA Bde were concentrated in the Gun Defence Areas (GDAs) at Birmingham (24 guns) and Coventry (12 guns).

Phoney War and Battle of Britain
73rd AA Regiment left the brigade in November 1939 to join the Advanced Air Striking Force in France. After the Dunkirk evacuation in May–June 1940, some AA units that had served in France with the British Expeditionary Force were sent to the West Midlands to refit and joined the brigade. In the summer of 1940 the AA regiments of the RA were redesignated Heavy Anti-Aircraft (HAA) to distinguish them from the new Light Anti-Aircraft (LAA) units being formed.

Although most of the Luftwaffe air raids during the Battle of Britain and the early part of The Blitz concentrated on London and the South and East Coasts, the West Midlands also suffered badly, with Birmingham and Coventry experiencing heavy raids in August and October.

The Blitz

In November 1940 the brigade came under the command of the newly formed 11 AA Division based at Birmingham. It was commanded by Maj-Gen Archibald, formerly commander of 34 AA Bde. In the autumn the brigade was joined by 60th (City of London) HAA Rgt, re-equipped after its return from Dunkirk.

Coventry Blitz
The new division was still being formed when the Luftwaffe launched a series of devastating raids, beginning with the notorious Coventry Blitz on 14/15 November. The Coventry raid was preceded by a dozen pathfinder aircraft of Kampfgeschwader 100 riding an X-Gerät beam to drop flares and incendiary bombs on the target. The huge fires that broke out in the congested city centre then attracted successive 40-strong waves of bombers flying at heights between 12,000 and 20,000 feet to saturate the defences. The AA Defence Commander (AADC) of 95th HAA Rgt had prepared a series of concentrations to be fired using sound-locators and GL Mk. I gun-laying radar, and 128 concentrations were fired before the bombing severed all lines of communication and the noise drowned out sound-location. Some gun positions were able to fire at searchlight beam intersections, glimpsed through the smoke and guessing the range. Although the Coventry guns fired 10 rounds a minute for the whole 10-hour raid, only three aircraft were shot down over the UK that night, and the city centre was gutted. The Coventry raid was followed by three consecutive nights (19–22 November) of attacks on Birmingham and other Black Country industrial towns including West Bromwich, Dudley and Tipton.

The change in enemy tactics led to HAA guns being moved from London to the West Midlands. 6th HAA Regt, a Regular regiment that had seen action in France and been evacuated from Dunkirk, received orders on 23 November to move RHQ with 3 and 12 HAA Btys (16 x mobile 3.7-inch guns, 2 x GL sets) from the London Inner Artillery Zone to the Kidderminster/Wolverhampton area. Each battery required a convoy of 65 vehicles for this move. They were ready for action in their new positions by dusk on 24 November, with 3 HAA Bty occupying an 8-gun position (H49) at Upper Penn, south-west of Wolverhampton, Right Troop of 12 HAA Bty at Wergs (H51) and Left Trp at Bushbury (H51), both north-west of Wolverhampton. Sections of 38th (The King's Regiment) Searchlight Rgt were also present at these sites. 15 HAA Battery rejoined 6 HAA Rgt from London by train on 11 December and occupied two sites in the Castle Bromwich area, though no guns were available until 17 January 1941, when two of the older 3-inch mobile guns were installed at each site. Meanwhile, 15 HAA Bty provided anti-paratroop fighting patrols to defend 34 AA Bde HQ and the GDA Gun Operations Room (GOR) in case of invasion.

6th HAA Regiment was still regarded as a mobile unit, and in February 1941 it was warned to prepare for a mobilisation exercise. This exercise (Operation Chestnut) was carried out in Oxfordshire in March and April, though the gunsites in 34 AA Bde area remained manned. The regiment became part of the War Office (WO) Reserve, while retaining its responsibilities under AA Command.

By March 1941, a new 67 AA Bde had been created in 11 AA Division by splitting 34 AA Bde: 95th HAA Rgt and 22nd Light AA (LAA) Rgt transferred to the new formation, while 12 HAA Bty of 6th HAA Rgt moved to Kenilworth and came under its operational control.

Birmingham Blitz

Birmingham was bombed again during December (3, 4, 11) and on 11 March 1941, but the full Birmingham Blitz came in April 1941, with heavy raids on the nights of 9/10 and 10/11 of the month, causing extensive damage and casualties.

The Blitz is generally held to have ended on 16 May 1941 with another attack on Birmingham. By now the HAA sites had the advantage of GL Mk I* radar with an elevation finding (E/F or 'Effie') attachment, and several attackers were turned away by accurate fire and their bombs scattered widely, some on nearby Nuneaton. The city was attacked again in July, but the Luftwaffe bombing offensive was effectively over. The West Midlands had been the hardest hit area of the UK after London and Merseyside.

Order of Battle 1940–41
The brigade's composition during the Blitz was as follows:

 6th HAA Rgt – from 1 AA Division 24 November 1940
 3, 15 HAA Btys
 12 HAA Bty – attached to 67 AA Bde until May 1941
 60th (City of London) HAA Rgt
 168, 169 HAA Btys
 95th (Birmingham) HAA Rgt – to 67 AA Bde
 204, 293, 340 HAA Btys
 110th HAA Rgt – new regiment raised in October 1940
 345, 346, 348, 354 HAA Btys
 112th HAA Rgt – new regiment raised in October 1940; to 8 AA Division by May 1941
 351, 352, 353 HAA Btys
 122nd HAA Rgt – new regiment raised in February 1941
 397 HAA Bty
 400 HAA Bty – attached to 4 AA Division
 401 HAA Bty – attached to 67 AA Bde
 22nd LAA Rgt – to 67 AA Bde
 70, 72, 141 Btys
 42nd LAA Rgt
 48, 145, 150, 231 Btys
 10th AA 'Z' Rgt – new regiment equipped with Z Battery rocket launchers raised in January 1941
 116, 133, 137 Z Btys
 138 Z Bty – attached to 1 AA Bde in 11 AA Division

Mid-War
Newly formed AA units joined the brigade, the HAA units increasingly being 'mixed' ones into which women of the Auxiliary Territorial Service were integrated. At the same time, experienced units were posted away for service overseas. 6th HAA Regiment was relieved by 71st (Forth) HAA Rgt and left in September 1941 for Middle East Forces (MEF); en route it was diverted to the Far East and its batteries were captured at the Fall of Singapore in February 1942 and Java in March 1942.

This continual turnover of units accelerated in 1942 with the preparations for Operation Torch and the need to relocate guns to counter the Baedeker Blitz and the Luftwaffes hit-and-run attacks against South Coast towns.

Order of Battle 1941–42
During this period 34 AA Bde was composed as follows:
 6th HAA Rgt – left for overseas service September 1941
 55th (Kent) HAA Rgt – from 6 AA Division by December 1941; to WO control December 1941, left February 1942 for Persia and Iraq Command (PAIFORCE)
 163, 166, 307 HAA Btys
 57th (Wessex) HAA Rgt – from 1 AA Division March 1942; to 9 AA Division May 1942
 213, 214, 215 HAA Btys
 60th HAA Rgt – to 68 AA Bde, 11 AA Division, Summer 1941
 168, 169 HAA Btys
 206 HAA Bty – from 58th (Kent) HAA Rgt, 6 AA Division, June 1941
 65th (Manchester Regiment) HAA Rgt – from Orkney and Shetland Defences (OSDEF) May 1941; left AA Command by May 1942, later MEF
 181, 182, 196 Btys
 183 Bty – left Summer 1941
 432 Bty – joined Summer 1941
 66th (Leeds Rifles) HAA Rgt – from 10 AA Division January 1942; to WO reserve February 1942, arrived in India May 1942
 184, 186, 296, 421 HAA Btys 
 71st (Forth) HAA Rgt – from 3 AA Division September 1941 while in WO Reserve; to WO Control by April 1942, later to Operation Torch
 227, 229, 317, 325 HAA Btys
 95th HAA Rgt – returned from 67 AA Bde December 1941; left January 1942, arrived in India April 1942
 107th HAA Rgt – from 4 AA Division by May 1942; to 5 AA Division June 1942
 334, 335, 337, 390 HAA Btys
 110th HAA Rgt – to OSDEF May 1941
 122nd HAA Rgt – to 67 AA Bde by December 1941
 397, 400 Btys
 401 Bty – attached to 67 AA Bde until Summer 1941
 134th (Mixed) HAA Rgt – new regiment formed in September 1941
 456 (M) HAA Bty – to new 168 (M) HAA Rgt August 1942
 459 (M) HAA Bty – attached to 4 AA Division August 1942; attached to 68 AA Bde September 1942
 460, 461 (M) HAA Btys
 142nd (Mixed) HAA Rgt – from 67 AA Bde June 1942
 477, 488, 492, 534 (M) HAA Btys
 22nd LAA Rgt – returned from 67 AA Bde Summer 1941; to 54 AA Bde, 11 AA Division, June 1942
 70, 72, 141 LAA Btys
 42nd LAA Rgt  – left Summer 1941; to MEF by December 1941
 10th AA 'Z' Rgt – to 67 AA Bde May 1941; returned by December 1941
 116, 133, 137, 138, 185 Z Btys
 34 AA Brigade Signal Office Mixed Sub-Section (part of No 2 Company, 11 AA Division Mixed Signal Unit, Royal Corps of Signals)

Later war
A reorganisation of AA Command in October 1942 saw the AA divisions disbanded and replaced by a number of AA Groups more closely aligned with the groups of RAF Fighter Command. 11 AA Division merged into 4 AA Group covering the West Midlands and North West England and cooperating with 9 Group RAF.

By March 1944 AA Command was being forced to release manpower to 21st Army Group for the planned Allied invasion of continental Europe (Operation Overlord), and most regiments lost a battery.

Order of Battle 1942–44
During this period 34 AA Bde was composed as follows:
 134th (M) HAA Rgt – to 6 AA Group March 1944
 459, 460, 461, 583 (M) HAA Btys
 142nd (M) HAA Rgt – to 1 AA Group September 1944
 477 (M) HAA Bty – attached to 33 (Western) AA Bde, 4 AA Group, until April 1943 488 (M) HAA Bty – attached to 33 (Western) AA Bde during May 1943 492 (M) HAA Bty – left May 1944 534 (M) HAA Bty – attached to 33 (Western) AA Bde from May 1943 168th (M) HAA Rgt – new regiment raised in August 1942; to 2 AA Group January 1944 456 (M) HAA Bty – attached to 68 AA Bde until December 1942 
 557, 559, 611 (M) HAA Btys
 170th (M) HAA Rgt – from 2 AA Group January 1944 528, 554, 567 (M) HAA Btys
 568 (M) HAA Bty – left February 1944 111th LAA Rgt – from 54 AA Bde May 1943; to 61 AA Bde, 4 AA Group, May 1944 348 LAA Bty – left November 1943 349, 350 LAA Btys
 363 LAA Bty – left by March 1944 10th (M) AA 'Z' Rgt
 137, 138, 185, 223 Z Btys
 231 Z Bty – joined January 1943 18th (M) AA 'Z' Rgt – new regiment raised in October 194218 AA Z Rgt at RA 39–45.
 115 Z Bty – until September 1943 116 Z Bty – joined September 1943 
 133, 199, 200 Z Btys
 193 Z Bty – joined January 1943; left by March 1944 34 AA Brigade Signal Office Mixed Sub-Section (part of 4 Mixed Signal Company, 4 AA Group Mixed Signal Unit)

AA 'Z' Rgts were redesignated AA Area Mixed Rgts in April 1944.

Operation Diver
Shortly after D-Day, the Germans began launching V-1 flying bombs, codenamed 'Divers', against London. These presented AA Command's biggest challenge since the Blitz. Defences had been planned against this new form of attack (Operation Diver), but it presented a severe problem for AA guns, and after two weeks' experience AA Command carried out a major reorganisation, stripping guns from the Midlands and repositioning them along the South Coast to target V-1s coming in over the English Channel. As the launching sites in Northern France were overrun by 21st Army Group, the Luftwaffe began air-launching V-1s from the North Sea, and further HAA batteries had to stripped from the Midlands and repositioned along the East Coast.Routledge, pp. 408–19.

Order of Battle 1944–45
During this period 34 AA Bde was composed as follows:
 148th (M) HAA Rgt – from 1 AA Group November 1944; left late December 624, 629 (M) HAA Btys – left early December 1944 631, 633 (M) HAA Btys
 168th (M) HAA Rgt – returned from 1 AA Group November 1944; left December 1944 557, 559, 611 (M) HAA Btys
 170th (M) HAA Rgt – left December 1944 528, 554, 567 (M) HAA Btys
 8th AA Area Mixed Rgt – joined by February, disbanded March 1945 10th AA Area Mixed Rgt
 18th AA Area Mixed Rgt
 24th AA Area Mixed Rgt – joined by February, disbanded March 1945In October 1944, the brigade's HQ establishment was 9 officers, 8 male other ranks and 25 members of the ATS, together with a small number of attached drivers, cooks and mess orderlies (male and female). In addition, the brigade's Mixed Signal Office Section comprised 5 male other ranks and 19 ATS.

Disbandment
The reduction in activity by the German Luftwaffe towards the end of the war saw a drastic reduction in AA defences.4 AA Group was disbanded in mid-March 1945, and 34 AA Bde transferred to the command of 5 AA Group. By this time, the brigade consisted solely of the rocket batteries of 10th and 18th AA Area Mixed Rgts, and these were disbanded in April.

Immediately after VE Day, the Brigade HQ became 34 AA Area Maintenance HQ and took over control of 11 AA Area Maintenance HQ. Shortly afterwards it disappeared from the order of battle.

When the TA was reformed in 1947, the AA Bdes were renumbered: the number 60 was reserved for a reconstituted 34 AA Bde, but was never used, and the brigade was never reformed.Watson, Territorial Army 

Notes

References
 Basil Collier, History of the Second World War, United Kingdom Military Series: The Defence of the United Kingdom, London: HM Stationery Office, 1957.
 Gen Sir Martin Farndale, History of the Royal Regiment of Artillery: The Years of Defeat: Europe and North Africa, 1939–1941, Woolwich: Royal Artillery Institution, 1988/London: Brasseys, 1996, .
 J.B.M. Frederick, Lineage Book of British Land Forces 1660–1978, Vol II, Wakefield, Microform Academic, 1984, .
 Norman E.H. Litchfield, The Territorial Artillery 1908–1988 (Their Lineage, Uniforms and Badges), Nottingham: Sherwood Press, 1992, .
 Brig N.W. Routledge, History of the Royal Regiment of Artillery: Anti-Aircraft Artillery 1914–55, London: Royal Artillery Institution/Brassey's, 1994, .
 Patrick Walker, 6th Heavy Anti-Aircraft Regiment, Royal Artillery'', Rev Edn, Gloucester: Choir Press, 2013, .

Online sources
 British Army units from 1945 on
 British Military History
 Generals of World War II
 Orders of Battle at Patriot Files
 The Royal Artillery 1939–45
 Graham Watson, The Territorial Army 1947

Military units and formations established in 1938
Air defence brigades of the British Army
Anti-Aircraft brigades of the British Army in World War II
34
Military units and formations disestablished in 1945